Bryce Boneau (born 2002) is an American soccer player who will play for the University of Notre Dame for the 2021-2022 season. Boneau is the 2021 recipient of the Gatorade Player of the Year for Boys' Soccer, a national recognition for the top boys high school soccer player in the United States.

Boneau played high school soccer for Keller High School in Keller, Texas, and youth soccer for Odyssey FC, Solar FC and for FC Dallas.

Career 
Boneau played both high school and club soccer during his youth years. As a freshman, Boneau played high school soccer for Keller High School, but suffered a hip fracture in a preseason game, sidelining him for the remainder of the season. During his sophomore year, Boneau played with Solar FC in the U.S. Soccer Development Academy where his team won the U17 DA National Championships. He played for Solar's U19DA team for his junior year, but due to the COVID-19 pandemic, the USDA season was canceled, allowing him the opportunity to return to high school soccer.

During his senior year, Boneau had a breakout year, scoring 18 goals and 19 assists in 21 matches, and helped lead Keller High School to the Conference 6A Region 1 tournament semifinals, a record for the Keller boys' soccer program. Keller finished the season with a 17–3–0 record.  Boneau was named First Team All-State and was the Dallas Morning News Offensive Player of the Year.  At the end of the season, Boneau won the Gatorade National Boys' Soccer Player of the Year award.

Boneau signed a National Letter of Intent to play college soccer for Notre Dame. He missed out on his freshman year due to an injury. On August 25, 2022, Boneau made his collegiate debut, starting and playing 78 minutes in a 1–3 loss to Seattle University.  On August 29, 2022 Boneau dished out his first two collegiate assists in a 3–2 away win at Michigan State University.

References

External links 
 
 Bryce Boneau at TopDrawer Soccer

2003 births
Living people
American people of French descent
Association football midfielders
People from Keller, Texas
People from Johnson County, Kansas
Soccer players from Texas
Notre Dame Fighting Irish men's soccer players
American soccer players
Christians from Texas